Whore of New York: A Confession is a novella-sized memoir and tell-all personal account released in 2021 by sex worker and debut author Liara Roux, detailing her early life and her decision to become a voluntary sex worker, alongside experiences of abuse that influenced her. The book, which features a wide variety of taboo and controversial topics, has earned praise in feminist and literary circles, owing largely to Roux's candid admissions.

Plot
Liara Roux, an autistic resident of New York City's Upper East Side, recalls her childhood of conservative Christian surroundings and an abusive father, in juxtaposition with her latent desire to be involved with prostitution. As an adult, Roux is sexually abused in a lesbian relationship with her partner, and finds solace in the practice of sex work, even when her sexual experiences with clients are flawed. Roux raises questions about sex and sexuality as commodities, bodily autonomy, sexual consent, and the worth of the individual in a collective western society. She also tells of her medical conditions in life, including excruciating migraines, and her poor experience when seeking proper healthcare. The book continues with various personal accounts of Roux's experiences with clients, as she seeks independence from her partner after a bad marriage.

Critical reception
Whore of New York received praise for its candid style and individuality. Molly Young of The New York Times said of the book, "Roux has zero interest in pretending that her experience is typical of her profession. This memoir, like all memoirs, is about the particularities of an individual life. It’s not about the state of the sex worker in America. Roux likes her work, but that doesn’t mean it is without discomfort, anxiety, alienation and fear." Tracy Clark-Flory, writing for Jezebel, noted the human rights aspects of the book, saying, "the stigma that sex workers face in society makes us a lot more vulnerable. A more honest telling of sex work, and the experience of it, can really capture why it’s so important that sex workers be granted these rights."

Whore of New York was released in 2021 as a paperback through small-press publisher Repeater Books, an audiobook, and as an eBook in the United States. In Canada, the book is sold at Indigo Books and Music and the University of King's College Co-Op Bookstore.

References

2021 non-fiction books
Feminist books
Censored books
Books about New York City
Non-fiction books about American prostitution
Books about women
American memoirs
Books about autistic women
LGBT-related books
LGBT non-fiction books
Bisexual non-fiction books
Lesbian non-fiction books
2020s LGBT literature